Klo may refer to:

 Kalibo International Airport (IATA: KLO), Philippines
 Kamtapur Liberation Organisation, India
 Karabakh Liberation Organization, Azerbaijan
 Korea Liaison Office, a South Korean special forces unit
 KLO-FM, a radio station serving Coalville, Utah, US
 KMES, a radio station (1430 AM) licensed to serve Ogden, Utah, United States, which held the call sign KLO from 1929 to 2020
 Lhoba people of Southeastern Tibet, also known as "Klo"
 A neighbourhood of Kelowna, British Columbia, Canada